US de Moursal is a football (soccer) club from Chad based in N'Djamena.

In 2013 the team has played in Chad Premier League.

Stadium
The club plays home matches on Stade Omnisports Idriss Mahamat Ouya.

External links

Football clubs in Chad
N'Djamena